"The Hidden Image" was an American television play broadcast live on November 12, 1959, as part of the CBS television series, Playhouse 90.  It was the fourth episode of the fourth season of Playhouse 90 and the 121st episode overall.

Plot
The plot concerns the pressures of modern politics as shown through a corruption investigation into a politician of the highest integrity.

Production
John Houseman was the producer. David Karp wrote the teleplay'.

The cast consisted of Franchot Tone as Avery Yarbrough, Martin Gabel as George Barrow, Nancy Marchand as Mrs. Yarbrough, George Grizzard as Leo Portnoy, and Frank Maxwell as Tommy Atwell.

Reception
Fred Danzig of the UPI called it a play of "uncanny timeliness", though he concluded that the writer had "cluttered his story with too many gimmicks, inconsistencies and contrived situations."

In The New York Times, John P. Shanley found it "bland and only intermittently interesting."

References

1959 American television episodes
Playhouse 90 (season 4) episodes
1959 television plays